Jat Education Society, Rohtak is one of the education societiy of Rohtak, Haryana, India.

List of educational institutions 
Following is a list of educational institutions that are run and managed by Jat Education Society, Rohtak.
 Chhotu Ram Polytechnic
 Chhotu Ram Memorial Public School
 Maharani Kishori Jat Kanya Mahavidyalaya
 Chhotu Ram College of Education
 Jat Heroes Memorial Anglo Sanskrit High School
 Jat Heroes Memorial Anglo Sanskrit Senior Secondary School
 Jat Heroes Memorial Anglo Sanskrit Primary School
 Sir Chotu Ram College Of Law

Campus 

Campus Of Jat Education Society, Rohtak is located on Eastern side of Rohtak, near Delhi by pass, next to MDU Rohtak. Its campus consists of 11 separate entities, hostels, playgrounds and parks.

Gallery

References

External links 
Jat Education Society, Rohtak
Matu Ram Institute of Engineering & Management
Maharshi Dayanand University, Rohtak
All India Council for Technical Education
Haryana State Counseling Society

Engineering colleges in Haryana
Jat
Education in Haryana